Chimbu, more frequently spelled Simbu, is a province in the Highlands Region of Papua New Guinea. The province has an area of 6,112 km2 and a population of 376,473 (2011 census). The capital of the province is Kundiawa. Mount Wilhelm, the tallest mountain in Papua New Guinea, is on the border of Simbu.

Geography 
Chimbu is located in the central highlands cordillera of Papua New Guinea. It shares geographic and political boundaries with five provinces: Jiwaka, Eastern Highlands, Southern Highlands, Gulf and Madang. It is a significant source of organically produced coffee.

Chimbu is a province with limited natural resources and very rugged mountainous terrain. The economic progress of the province has been slower than some other highlands provinces.

Education 
There are seven secondary schools in the province: Kondiu Rosary, Yauwe Moses, Kerowagi, Muaina, Gumine, Mt Willem and Kundiawa Day Secondary School. The province also has many high and primary schools.

Districts and LLGs 
The province is subdivided into six districts, with each district further subdivided into 18 rural LLGs and 2 urban LLGs areas. Each of the RLLGs are headed by a President and Urban LLG by a Mayor. Each LLGs have various council wards represented by a councillor who sits in the Council Assembly. All the councillors are democratically elected and Presidents are elected in the Council Assembly. For census purposes, the LLG areas are again subdivided into wards and those into census units.

Political governance and administration

Chimbu provincial leaders
The province was governed by a decentralised provincial administration, headed by a Premier, from 1977 to 1995. Following reforms taking effect that year, the national government reassumed some powers, and the role of Premier was replaced by a position of Governor, to be held by the winner of the province-wide seat in the National Parliament of Papua New Guinea.

Premiers (1976–1995)

Governors (1995–present)

Members of the National Parliament 
The province and each district is represented by a Member of the National Parliament. There is one provincial electorate and each district is a local ("Open") electorate.

See also
 Adumo

References 

 Deck, D. Sipu-u-u-u to Simbu, Paradise Magazine

 
Provinces of Papua New Guinea
Highlands Region